Vladislav Novikov may refer to:

 Vladislav Novikov (skier) (born 1993), Russian alpine skier
 Vladislav Novikov (footballer), Russian footballer for Ukrainian Premier League club SC Tavriya Simferopol